Michael or Mike Rowland may refer to:

 Michael James Rowland (born 1964), Australian film director
 Michael Rowland (news presenter) (born 1968), Australian television news presenter and journalist
 Michael Rowland (jockey) (1963–2004), American jockey
 Mike Rowland (baseball) (born 1953), Major League Baseball pitcher
 Mike Rowland (wheelwright), wheelwright and coachbuilder in Devon
 Michael Rowland (prelate) (1929–2012), Roman Catholic bishop of Dundee, KwaZulu-Natal, South Africa